Razlivnaya is a rural locality (a selo) in Chernovsky Selsoviet of Svobodnensky District, Amur Oblast, Russia. The population was 162 as of 2018. There are 4 streets.

Geography 
Razlivnaya is located on the right bank of the Bolshaya Pera River, 39 km north of Svobodny (the district's administrative centre) by road. Buzuli is the nearest rural locality.

References 

Rural localities in Svobodnensky District